Centurion Air Cargo Flight 164 was a chartered international cargo flight, flying from Bogota's El Dorado International Airport while en route to Miami International Airport. The flight was operated by Kalitta Air and the aircraft was wet leased by Centurion Air Cargo. On 7 July 2008, the aircraft, a Boeing 747-209BSF registered as N714CK, crashed shortly after takeoff. All aboard suffered injuries, but none were killed. Two people on the ground were killed after the plane slammed into a farm. The crash was the second crash of a Boeing 747 in 2008 in Kalitta Air service, after a previous accident at Brussels in May.

An investigation was launched by Colombian authorities and concluded that the crash was caused by dual engine failures. During its take-off phase, engine #4 and then engine #1 suffered loss of power. The flight crews could not recover the plane, which subsequently crashed into a ranch house.

Accident
The aircraft took off from El Dorado International Airport to Miami International Airport carrying 8 crew and a cargo of flowers, as a chartered cargo flight. The flight was operated by Kalitta Air for Centurion Air Cargo as Flight 164. During its rotation, the Number 4 engine suffered a non-recoverable surge, causing it to lose power. It then declared emergency 20 seconds later reporting an engine fire in engine number 4 (outer right hand engine) and requested to return to runway 13R.  Bogota Tower cleared the airplane for that return to and landing on 13R. The airplane initiated a left-hand turn as by the published engine out procedure. Just about 20 seconds after the loss of the number 4 engine, the number 1 engine somehow failed. By this time, the aircraft had lost its ability to climb and started to lose control.

The crew quickly recognized that they no longer had the thrust necessary to get back to the airport and attempted an off-airport landing. A taxi driver fueling his car at the nearby petrol station said that the airplane hit the wires along the highway triggering sparks, before it impacted ground. The aircraft crashed at 03:57 local time. It skimmed over trees and crash landed, skidded along the field and slammed into a ranch house, killing 2 people, Pedro Suarez, 50, and his 13-year-old son Edwin. The aircraft then broke up into several sections.

Rescuers immediately arrived at the crash site and evacuated the survivors. All eight crew members survived, but one was in critical condition. At least 5 people were seriously injured in the crash. Two crew members were treated at a Madrid hospital, while six others were sent to the Central Police Hospital in Bogota.

Aircraft

The aircraft, a Boeing 747-209BSF, registered as N714CK, was a 27 years and 3 months old aircraft. It had a total airframe hours of 90,613 hours equipped with 4 Pratt and Whitney Canada engines with a MSN number of 519. It was delivered to China Airlines in 1981 as B-1886. In 1999, the plane was given a new registration as B-18753 when it transferred to China Airlines's freight division, China Airlines Cargo until they were grounded by ROC in 2002 following the crash of China Airlines Flight 611 and finally, it was acquired by Kalitta Air in November of the same year.

Investigation
The Colombian Grupo de Investigacion de Accidentes opened an investigation into the crash. The U.S National Transportation Safety Board sent five investigators to assist the Colombian investigation team. The Federal Aviation Administration, aircraft-maker Boeing Co. and engine-maker Pratt & Whitney also assisting the investigation.

The 51-year-old captain Bryan Beebe (8,874 hours total, 2,874 hours on type) was pilot flying; the 49-year-old first officer Frank Holley (11,373 hours total, 2,853 hours on type) was pilot monitoring. The 59-year-old flight engineer Joseph Kendall had a total flying experience of 10,665 hours and 2,665 hours on type.

Both the flight data recorder and the cockpit voice recorder were recovered and taken for an analysis. The aircraft was configured for takeoff with flaps at 10 degrees (the flaps remaining in that position until impact) with the engines at EPR between 1.69 and 1.72, when it accelerated through Vr (152 knots) and rotation was initiated. While the aircraft rotated the pitch went through 13 degrees nose up and the airspeed had already exceeded V2 (162 KIAS) when engine #4 lost power, the engine rolling down from about 1.7 EPR to 1.0 EPR within 2–3 seconds, the engine surged 4 times during that time. Engineers determined that the high-pressure turbine of engine #4, that had been installed during the last work shop visit in January 2008, was inefficient due to too large a blade tip clearance, the reduced chord and wear of leading edges of fan blades resulting in a loss of engine power estimated at 5.8% and impaired stability and operability of the engine.

Engine #1 then suffered a failure of the low-pressure turbine, which resulted in ejection of engine parts through the engine exhaust. The failure originated in the third stage of the LPT, engineers believe the failure started with the loss of a number of guide vanes or the loss of a large piece of outside air seal due to thermal damage. Although an overboost condition existed outside regular engine operation range, the application of such engine power for a short period of time should not have caused an engine failure. The exact cause of the engine failure could not be determined.

Investigators noted that engine #2 suffered a rapid decline of EPR and recovery of EPR for five times, each lasting for about 2–3 seconds, the surges happening at 87 seconds, 33 seconds, 13 and 3 seconds before impact. Few minutes later, the aircraft crashed.

On 22 August 2011, the investigation board finally published the final report. The crash was caused by the failure of two engines of the aircraft, specifically engine number 4 and engine number 1. The number 4 engine suffered a non-recoverable surge during the rotation. The aircraft then struggled to climb. As the flight crews were conducting the emergency procedure, the number 1 engine somehow failed. With two engines malfunctioning, the aircraft was unable to sustain flight in its configuration. It began to experience problems with a third engine, the inboard left-hand JT9D, which repeatedly surged.

See also
 Kalitta Air Flight 207, also a Kalitta Air Boeing 747 crashed on take-off from Brussels airport due to birds hitting the engines on May 25, 2008.
 Air Algérie Flight 6289, Algeria's deadliest passenger plane crash that was caused due to engine failure on takeoff.

References

External links
 Final report
 Accident Description, Aviation Safety Network

Aviation accidents and incidents in Colombia
Aviation accidents and incidents in 2008
2008 in Colombia
Accidents and incidents involving the Boeing 747
Colombia–United States relations
July 2008 events in South America